USS O-15 (SS-76) was one of 16 O-class submarines built for the United States Navy during World War I.

Description
The later O-boats (O-11 through O-16) were designed by Lake Torpedo Boat Company to different specifications from the earlier ones designed by Electric Boat. They did not perform as well, and are sometimes considered a separate class. They displaced  on the surface and  submerged. The O-class submarines had a crew of 29 officers and enlisted men.

For surface running, the boats were powered by two  diesel engines, each driving one propeller shaft. When submerged each propeller was driven by a  electric motor. They could reach  on the surface and  underwater.

The boats were armed with four 18 inch (450 mm)  torpedo tubes in the bow. They carried four reloads, for a total of eight torpedoes. The O-class submarines were also armed with a single 3"/50 caliber deck gun.

Construction and career
O-15 was laid down on 21 September 1916 by California Shipbuilding Company in Long Beach, California. The boat was launched on 12 February 1918, sponsored by Mrs. J. J. Murphy, and commissioned on 27 August 1918. Commissioning during the final months of World War I, O-15 saw brief war time service, on patrol along the Atlantic coast. After the war, she reported to Philadelphia, Pennsylvania, where machinists and electricians worked on her until 20 September 1919, when she was reduced to "in commission, in reserve," at Cape May, New Jersey. She departed Philadelphia in April 1920 and proceeded, via Jamaica, to Coco Solo, Panama Canal Zone, where she underwent overhaul and conducted experimental tests. Conducting training cruises, she operated in and around Cuba and the Virgin Islands early in 1922 and returned to Coco Solo in April.

O-15 reported to Philadelphia in November 1923 and decommissioned there 11 June 1924 after just five and a half years of service. Struck from the Naval Vessel Register on 9 May 1930, she was scrapped, under terms of the London Naval Treaty on 30 July 1930.

Notes

References

External links
 

United States O-class submarines
World War I submarines of the United States
Ships built in Los Angeles
1918 ships